Freemanichthys is a monospecific genus of marine ray-finned fish belonging to the family Agonidae. This species is found in the northwestern Pacific Ocean. This species grows to a length of  TL. This only species in the genus is Freemanichthys thompsoni.

References
 

Agoninae
Fish described in 1898